Potter Creek is a stream in the municipalities of Quinte West and Belleville in Central Ontario, Canada. It is a tributary of the Bay of Quinte and is thus in the Lake Ontario drainage basin.

Course
It continues south, then turns east, flows under Wallbridge-Loyalist Road, and enters the city of Belleville. The creek turns south, heads under the Canadian National Railway main line and Moira Street, and curves southwest. Potter Creek flows once again under Wallbridge-Loyalist Road and re-inters Quinte West, passing into Potter's Creek Conservation Area. The Bay of Quinte is part of Lake Ontario.

References

Rivers of Hastings County